Vitaliy Lysytskyi (born 16 April 1982 in Svitlovodsk, Kirovohrad Oblast, Ukrainian SSR) is a retired Ukrainian football defender.

Honours

Team 
Dynamo Kyiv
 Ukrainian Premier League: champion 2000
 Ukrainian Cup: runner-up 2002

Ukraine under-19
2000 UEFA European Under-18 Football Championship: runner-up

External links
 
 
Profile on Football Squads

1982 births
Living people
Ukrainian footballers
Ukraine international footballers
FC Dnipro players
FC Dynamo Kyiv players
FC Dynamo-2 Kyiv players
FC Dynamo-3 Kyiv players
FC Chornomorets Odesa players
FC Kryvbas Kryvyi Rih players
FC Hoverla Uzhhorod players
Ukrainian Premier League players
Ukrainian First League players
Ukrainian Second League players
People from Svitlovodsk
FC Metalurh Zaporizhzhia players
FC Kolos Kovalivka players
Association football midfielders
Ukraine under-21 international footballers
Sportspeople from Kirovohrad Oblast